Angelica Danielle "Angel" Robinson (born April 20, 1987) is an American-Montenegrin professional basketball player for the Phoenix Mercury of the Women's National Basketball Association (WNBA). Before signing with the Storm in 2014, she was drafted number 20 overall in the 2010 WNBA Draft.

Georgia  statistics
Source

References

External links

1987 births
Living people
American women's basketball players
Montenegrin women's basketball players
American emigrants to Montenegro
Montenegrin people of African-American descent
Naturalized citizens of Montenegro
Basketball players from Marietta, Georgia
Georgia Lady Bulldogs basketball players
McDonald's High School All-Americans
Parade High School All-Americans (girls' basketball)
Seattle Storm players
Phoenix Mercury players
Centers (basketball)